Kellogg Creek is a tributary of Indian Slough, in Contra Costa County, California. Indian Slough itself is a tributary of the Old River, an old channel of the San Joaquin River.  Kellogg Creek was formerly named Arroyo Santa Ángela de Fulgino by Pedro Font, on April 4, 1776, as the expedition of Juan Bautista de Anza passed through the area. In the 19th century it was known to the Californios as Arroyo del Sur.

Its source is located at 
 at the head of a canyon in the hills north of Brushy Peak, in the Diablo Range in Alameda County, California.

References 

Rivers of California
Sacramento–San Joaquin River Delta
Tributaries of the San Joaquin River
Rivers of Alameda County, California
Rivers of Contra Costa County, California
La Vereda del Monte